Hebeloma vaccinum is a species of agaric fungus in the family Hymenogastraceae. It was described as new to science in 1965 by French mycologist Henri Romagnesi.

See also
List of Hebeloma species

References

Fungi described in 1965
vaccinum
Fungi of Europe